James George Hamilton, 6th Duke of Hamilton and 3rd Duke of Brandon, KT (10 July 1724 – 17 January 1758) was a Scottish peer.

Early years and education
Hamilton was the son of the 5th Duke of Hamilton, by his first wife, the former Lady Anne Cochrane, and was styled as Marquess of Clydesdale from his birth until his father's death. He was educated at Winchester College from 1734 to 1740. He matriculated at St Mary Hall, Oxford on 23 February 1741, knighted into the Order of the Thistle in or around 1742, and created a DCL on 14 April 1743.

On 14 February (St. Valentine's Day) 1752, Hamilton met the society beauty Elizabeth Gunning at Bedford House in London. According to Horace Walpole, the duke wished to marry her that night and he called for a local parson to perform the ceremony. However, without a licence, calling of banns and a ring, the parson refused and they were eventually married that night in Mayfair Chapel (which did not require a licence) in a clandestine marriage, with a ring from a bed curtain. The couple had three children:
Lady Elizabeth Hamilton (26 January 1753 – 14 March 1797), married Edward Smith-Stanley, 12th Earl of Derby
James Hamilton, 7th Duke of Hamilton (18 February 1755 – 7 July 1769)
Douglas Hamilton, 8th Duke of Hamilton (24 July 1756 – 2 August 1799)

On 2 March 1743, he succeeded to his father's title of Duke of Hamilton.

Death
He died on 17 January 1758, aged 33, at Great Tew, Oxfordshire from a cold caught whilst out hunting. He was buried in February 1758 at the family mausoleum at Hamilton, South Lanarkshire.

Freemasonry
The 6th Duke of Hamilton held the position of Right Worshipful Master of the local Masonic Lodge, Hamilton Kilwinning No.7 for three consecutive years from 1753 to 1755.

Ancestry

References

External links
Elizabeth Gunning profile
Lodge Hamilton Kilwinning No. 7

1724 births
1758 deaths
Alumni of St Mary Hall, Oxford
106
103
James Hamilton, 6th Duke of Hamilton
Knights of the Thistle
James